Boonville High School is a public high school located in Boonville, Indiana. The school is one of three high schools in Warrick County, that make up the Warrick County School Corporation.

About
Boonville High School, Warrick County's oldest high school, was built in 1958 and is located on a 34-acre site that borders North First Street in the city of Boonville.  A series of additions and remodeling were completed in 1976, 1983 and 2000.  The band room, auditorium, kitchen and cafeteria were renovated in 1983.  New additions at that time included an indoor swimming pool with spectator seating, adjacent locker and dressing rooms, faculty office space and a gymnasium.  The 2000 construction project renovated all existing classrooms and added a new technology education wing, art classrooms, an agricultural science facility and a greenhouse.  Technology improvements were also part of the 2000 project.  The entire building was networked, computers were added to all classrooms and software was purchased to expand the curriculum and increase student services.  Internet access to all classrooms was also completed at this time.

The football stadium, basketball gymnasium, track, five lighted tennis courts, a baseball field, a softball field and an indoor practice facility are located north and west of the main building.  Boonville High School provides a comprehensive and wide-ranging curriculum for all students.  Vocational, school-to-work, arts, college preparatory, advanced placement and courses for college credit are just some of the offerings available to students.  Nineteen varsity sports, competitive marching band, drama, vocal music, Future Farmers of America, Business Professionals of America, Student Council, Key Club and many other groups and organizations allow all students ample opportunity to participate in extra-curricular activities.

The school is accredited by the North Central Association of Colleges and Schools and is a member of the Pocket Athletic Conference.  Boonville High School currently carries an enrollment of 902 students.  They are served by 69 teachers and three counselors.

Notable alumni
Bibbles Bawel, former NFL player
James A. Hemenway, former United States Congressman and Senator from Indiana.
Jon Hilbert, former NFL player
Jeremy Spencer, Five Finger Death Punch drummer.
Travis Williams, former NFL player
Dustin Ransom, professional musician

See also
 List of high schools in Indiana

References

External links 
 Boonville High School
 Warrick County School Corporation
 

Public high schools in Indiana
High schools in Southwestern Indiana
Boonville, Indiana
Big Eight Conference (IHSAA)
Former Southern Indiana Athletic Conference members
Schools in Warrick County, Indiana
1958 establishments in Indiana